Janusz Henryk Żmijewski (born 4 March 1943) is a Polish retired footballer who played as a forward.

Playing career 
Born in Radzymin in the Masovian Voivodeship, he spent most of his career with Legia Warsaw. After his tenure with Legia he had stints with Ruch Chorzów, Avia Świdnik, A.A.C. Eagles, Polonia Warsaw, MKP Pogoń Siedlce, and KS Piaseczno.

When he finished off his career in Poland he went overseas to Canada to sign with the Toronto Falcons of the National Soccer League. During his tenure with Toronto he won the NSL Championship in 1980. He concluded his career with local amateur clubs like Toronto Polonia, Hamilton Legion, and Mississauga Polonia. After his retirement from competitive football he settled in Canada.

International career 
He earned 15 caps for Poland, scoring 7 goals. He made his debut on 1 November 1965 in a 6–1 loss to Italy at the Stadio Olimpico in Rome in qualification for the 1966 FIFA World Cup. In his next game, on 8 October 1967 at the Heysel Stadium in Brussels, he scored a hat-trick in a 4–2 win over Belgium in qualification for the 1968 European Nations Cup.

References

1943 births
Living people
People from Radzymin
Polish footballers
Polish expatriate footballers
Association football forwards
Legia Warsaw players
Poland international footballers
Sportspeople from Masovian Voivodeship
Toronto Falcons players
Canadian National Soccer League players
Ruch Chorzów players
Avia Świdnik players
A.A.C. Eagles players
Polonia Warsaw players
MKP Pogoń Siedlce players
Ekstraklasa players
National Soccer League (Chicago) players
Expatriate soccer players in Canada
Polish expatriate sportspeople in Canada
Expatriate soccer players in the United States
Polish expatriate sportspeople in the United States
Polish emigrants to Canada